The 2003 Nigerian Senate election in Ondo State was held on April 12, 2003, to elect members of the Nigerian Senate to represent Ondo State. Gbenga Ogunniya representing Ondo Central and Hosea Ehinlanwo representing Ondo South won on the platform of Peoples Democratic Party, while Titus Olupitan representing Ondo North won on the platform of the Alliance for Democracy.

Overview

Summary

Results

Ondo Central 
The election was won by Gbenga Ogunniya of the Peoples Democratic Party.

Ondo South 
The election was won by Hosea Ehinlanwo of the Peoples Democratic Party.

Ondo North 
The election was won by Titus Olupitan of the Alliance for Democracy.

References 

April 2003 events in Nigeria
Ondo State Senate elections
Ond